Igor Youriévitch Bogdanoff (29 August 1949 – 3 January 2022) and Grégoire "Grichka" Youriévitch Bogdanoff (29 August 1949 – 28 December 2021) were French twin television presenters, producers, and essayists who, from the 1970s on, presented various subjects in science fiction, popular science, and cosmology. They were involved in a number of controversies, most notably the Bogdanov affair, which brought to light the fact that the brothers had written nonsensical advanced physics papers that were nonetheless published in reputable scientific journals.

Early years 

Igor and Grichka Bogdanoff were identical twin brothers born to Maria "Maya" Dolores Franzyska Kolowrat-Krakowská (1926–1982), of Bohemian and Polish descent, and Yuri Mikhaïlovitch Bogdanoff (1928–2012), an itinerant Russian farm worker, later a painter. 

Igor was born 40 minutes before Grichka. They had no connection to, or involvement with, their father's family, and were raised by their maternal grandmother, Countess Bertha Kolowrat-Krakowská (1890–1982), in her castle in southern France. 

Bertha Kolowrat-Krakowská belonged to the noble Kolowrat family of Bohemia and was married to Count Hieronymus Colloredo-Mannsfeld (1870–1942), a member of the Austrian princely house of Colloredo-Mannsfeld. Her pregnancy by African-American tenor Roland Hayes caused her to forfeit access to her four elder children, to her palatial homes in Berlin and Prague, and also her reputation in European society. She tried to sustain her episodic relationship with Hayes after her divorce and his return to the United States, but declined his offer to legally adopt and raise their daughter, Maria, who became Igor and Grichka's mother.

Although the Bogdanoff twins claimed to be descended paternally from a noble Muslim Tatar family traceable to the beginning of the 17th century (originally from Penza, one of whose mirzas converted to Orthodox Christianity, and was rewarded with the title of prince by a decree from Tsar Feodor III; the mirza did not exercise this right, and the title of "Prince Bogdanoff" was lost by the end of the 19th century), there is scant evidence for that. Genealogist William Addams Reitwiesner observed: "The Bogdanov twins claim that their father was a member of a princely Russian family. Other than a statement by Dr. Stanislaus Dumin (included in a message posted by the twins on 7 January 2005 to the alt.talk.royalty Usenet newsgroup), there isn't much evidence to support this claim." Journalist and documentary filmmaker Maud Guillaumin, author of Le mystère Bogdanoff (L'Archipel, 2019), comprehensively examined the twins' account, noting it to comprise "approximations  and historical inaccuracies"; she found that Yuri Bogdanoff had gone to Spain as a young man, and, unable to return to the USSR as he would have been considered a spy and imprisoned, went to France and began "a life of wandering from farm to Pyrenean farm" before, in 1948 aged 21, arriving at the castle of his future mother-in-law, "renowned in the Gers for employing Slavs". Guillaumin noted that "the twins totally deny this sad odyssey. They explain that they have found proof that their father was the descendant of a prince, the right arm of Tsar Peter the Great", that "according to them, Youra was a young artist [...] he would have followed 'a solid training as a painter as a free auditor at the Beaux-Arts'", and that "it was there, according to the twins, who love romance, that a "famous writer" met in Paris would have introduced Youra to their grandmother". Guillaumin's interview with the Bogdanoff twins' godmother, Monique David, contradicted their romantic account, and established that the twins' mother, Maya, was pregnant with them at the time of her marriage to Yuri Bogdanoff, whom the countess considered an unworthy match for her daughter. She "chased him away", leading him to be absent from his sons' lives until they were ten years old, and subsequently divorced from Maya.

Besides French, they spoke German, Russian, and English.

Television shows 

The brothers began careers in television, hosting several popular programs on science and science fiction. The first of these, Temps X (Time X), ran from 1979 to 1989 and introduced several British and American science-fiction series to the French public, including The Prisoner, Star Trek, and Doctor Who, in addition to featuring musical guests such as Jean-Michel Jarre.

In 2002, the Bogdanoffs launched a new weekly television show, Rayons X (X Rays), on the French public channel France 2. In August 2004, they presented a 90-minute special cosmology program.

Academic careers 
Grichka Bogdanoff received a Ph.D. degree in mathematics from the University of Burgundy (Dijon) in 1999. In 2002, Igor Bogdanoff received a Ph.D. in theoretical physics from the University of Burgundy. Both brothers received the lowest passing grade of "honorable".

Bogdanov affair

In 2001 and 2002, the brothers published five papers (including "Topological field theory of the initial singularity of spacetime") in peer-reviewed physics journals. Controversy over the Bogdanoffs' work began on 22 October 2002, with an email sent by University of Tours physicist Max Niedermaier to University of Pittsburgh physicist Ezra T. Newman. Niedermaier suggested that the Bogdanoffs' Ph.D. theses and papers were "spoof[s]", created by throwing together instances of theoretical-physics jargon, including terminology from string theory: "The abstracts are delightfully meaningless combinations of buzzwords ... which apparently have been taken seriously."

Copies of the email reached American mathematical physicist John C. Baez, and on 23 October he created a discussion thread about the Bogdanoffs' work on the Usenet newsgroup sci.physics.research, titled "Physics bitten by reverse Alan Sokal hoax?" Baez was comparing the Bogdanoffs' publications to the 1996 Sokal affair, in which physicist Alan Sokal successfully submitted an intentionally nonsensical paper to a cultural studies journal in order to criticize that field's lax standards for discussing science. The Bogdanoffs quickly became a popular discussion topic, with most respondents agreeing that the papers were flawed.

The story spread in public media, prompting Niedermaier to offer an apology to the Bogdanoffs, admitting that he had not read the papers himself. The Bogdanoffs' background in entertainment lent some plausibility to the idea that they were attempting a deliberate hoax, but Igor Bogdanoff quickly denied the accusation.

In October 2002, the Bogdanoffs released an email containing apparently supportive statements by Laurent Freidel, then a visiting professor at the Perimeter Institute for Theoretical Physics. Soon after, Freidel denied writing any such remarks, telling the press that he had forwarded a message containing that text to a friend.

The online discussion was quickly followed by media attention. The Register reported on the dispute on 1 November 2002, and stories in The Chronicle of Higher Education, Nature, The New York Times, and other publications appeared soon after. These news stories included commentary by physicists.

One of the scientists who approved Igor Bogdanoff's thesis, Roman Jackiw of the Massachusetts Institute of Technology, spoke to The New York Times reporter Dennis Overbye. Overbye wrote that Jackiw was intrigued by the thesis, although it contained many points he did not understand. Jackiw defended the thesis. In contrast, Ignatios Antoniadis (of the École Polytechnique), who approved Grichka Bogdanoff's thesis, later reversed his judgment of it. Antoniadis told Le Monde:

I had given a favorable opinion for Grichka's defense, based on a rapid and indulgent reading of the thesis text. Alas, I was completely mistaken. The scientific language was just an appearance behind which hid incompetence and ignorance of even basic physics.

The journal Classical and Quantum Gravity (CQG) published one of the Bogdanoffs' papers, titled "Topological field theory of the initial singularity of spacetime"; Ian Russell, assistant director of its journals division, later issued a statement stating that "we deployed our standard peer-review process on that paper." After the publication of the article and the publicity surrounding the controversy, mathematician Greg Kuperberg posted to Usenet a statement written by the journal's senior publisher, Andrew Wray, and its co-editor, Hermann Nicolai. The statement read, in part,

Regrettably, despite the best efforts, the refereeing process cannot be 100% effective. Thus the paper ... made it through the review process even though, in retrospect, it does not meet the standards expected of articles in this journal... The paper was discussed extensively at the annual Editorial Board meeting ... and there was general agreement that it should not have been published. Since then several steps have been taken to further improve the peer review process in order to improve the quality assessment on articles submitted to the journal and reduce the likelihood that this could happen again.

The statement was quoted in The New York Times, The Chronicle of Higher Education, and Nature. Moreover, Die Zeit quoted Nicolai as saying that had the paper reached his desk, he would have immediately rejected it.

The Chinese Journal of Physics published Igor Bogdanoff's "The KMS state of spacetime at the Planck scale", while Nuovo Cimento published "KMS space-time at the Planck scale". According to physicist Arun Bala, all of these papers "involved purported applications of quantum theory to understand processes at the dawn of the universe", but ultimately turned out to be a "hoax perpetrated on the physics community."

Not all review evaluations were positive. Eli Hawkins, acting as a referee on behalf of the Journal of Physics A, suggested rejecting one of the Bogdanoffs' papers: "It would take up too much space to enumerate all the mistakes: indeed it is difficult to say where one error ends and the next begins."

Eventually, the controversy attracted mainstream media attention, opening new avenues for physicists' comments to be disseminated. Le Monde quoted Alain Connes, recipient of the 1982 Fields Medal, as saying, "I didn't need long to convince myself that they're talking about things that they haven't mastered." The New York Times reported that the physicists David Gross, Carlo Rovelli, and Lee Smolin considered the Bogdanoff papers nonsensical. Nobel laureate Georges Charpak later stated on a French talk show that the Bogdanoffs' presence in the scientific community was "nonexistent".

Robert Oeckl's official MathSciNet review of "Topological field theory of the initial singularity of spacetime" states that the paper is "rife with nonsensical or meaningless statements and suffers from a serious lack of coherence", follows up with several examples to illustrate his point, and concludes that the paper "falls short of scientific standards and appears to have no meaningful content." An official report from the Centre national de la recherche scientifique (CNRS), which became public in 2010, concluded that the paper "ne peut en aucune façon être qualifié de contribution scientifique" ("cannot in any way be considered a scientific contribution").

The CNRS report summarized the Bogdanoffs' theses thus: "Ces thèses n’ont pas de valeur scientifique. […] Rarement aura-t-on vu un travail creux habillé avec une telle sophistication" ("These theses have no scientific value. [...] Rarely have we seen a hollow work dressed with such sophistication").

Lawsuits
On December 30, 2004, the Bogdanoffs sued Ciel et Espace for defamation over the publication of a critical article titled "The Mystification of the Bogdanoffs". In September 2006, the case was dismissed after the Bogdanoffs missed court deadlines; they were ordered to pay €2,500 to the magazine's publisher to cover its legal costs. There was never a substantive ruling on whether or not the Bogdanoffs had been defamed.

Alain Riazuelo, an astrophysicist at the Institut d'Astrophysique de Paris, participated in many of the online discussions of the Bogdanoffs' work. He posted an unpublished version of Grichka Bogdanoff's Ph.D. thesis on his personal website, along with his critical analysis. Bogdanoff subsequently described this version as "dating from 1991 and too unfinished to be made public". Rather than suing Riazuelo for defamation, Bogdanoff filed a criminal complaint of copyright (droit d'auteur) violation against him in May 2011.

The police detained and interrogated Riazuelo. He was convicted in March 2012. A fine of €2,000 the court imposed was suspended, and only €1.00 of damages was awarded, but in passing judgement the court stated that the scientist had "lacked prudence", given "the fame of the plaintiff".

The verdict outraged many scientists, who felt that the police and courts should have no say in a discussion of the scientific merits of a piece of work. In April 2012, a group of 170 scientists published an open letter titled L'affaire Bogdanoff: Liberté, Science et Justice, Des scientifiques revendiquent leur droit au blâme (The Bogdanoff Affair: Liberty, Science and Justice, scientists claim their right of critique).

In 2014, the Bogdanoffs sued the weekly magazine Marianne for defamation, on account of reporting the magazine had published in 2010 which had brought the CNRS report to light. The magazine was eventually ordered to pay €64,000 in damages, much less than the €800,000 each which the Bogdanoffs had originally demanded. The Bogdanoffs also sued the CNRS for €1.2 million in damages, claiming that the CNRS report had "porté atteinte à leur honneur, à leur réputation et à leur crédit" ("undermined their honor, reputation and credit") and calling the report committee a "Stasi scientifique", but a tribunal ruled against them in 2015 and ordered them to pay €2,000.

Megatrend University
In 2005, the Bogdanoffs became professors at Megatrend University in Belgrade, where they were appointed to Chairs of Cosmology and made directors of the 'Megatrend Laboratory of Cosmology'. Mića Jovanović, the rector and owner of Megatrend University, wrote a preface for the Serbian edition of Avant le Big Bang. Jovanović himself later became embroiled in controversy and resigned his post, when he was found out to not have obtained a Ph.D. at the London School of Economics as he had claimed. This scandal, combined with the presence of the Bogdanoffs, contributed to an atmosphere of controversy surrounding Megatrend.

Personal lives 
The Bogdanoff twins, who denied having undergone plastic surgery, became known for their prominent cheekbones and chins. In 2010, The Sydney Morning Herald described the twins' cheekbones as "so high and bulbous as to appear to threaten their owners' vision", adding that the twins' appearance at the Cannes Film Festival had "caused a stir around the world". The Herald noted that the twins' cheekbones had become noticeably larger in the 1990s, and that "growth in their lips and chins continued unabated through the last decade". According to former education minister Luc Ferry, a friend of the brothers, they had both received botox injections for cosmetic treatment.

The twins became popular Internet memes, especially among enthusiasts of cryptocurrency, jokingly depicting the Bogdanoffs as "all-powerful market makers". Their status as "crypto memes" was covered by several outlets upon their deaths, including CNN, Business Insider, and The Daily Telegraph. The twins "went along with their meme fame", according to Business Insider, and said they predicted cryptocurrency in the 1980s on Temps X.

Igor Bogdanoff had six children, four from his first marriage and two from his second. He married his second wife, Amélie de Bourbon-Parme, civilly in Paris on 1 October 2009 and religiously in Chambord two days later.

Deaths
The Bogdanoff twins were both hospitalized, at the Georges Pompidou European Hospital in Paris, in critical condition on 15 December 2021, after contracting COVID-19. Grichka died on 28 December, and Igor died six days later, on 3 January 2022. They were 72 and both were unvaccinated. The funeral for both twins was held on 10 January 2022, in the Church of the Madeleine, in Paris, France.

Publications 
The Bogdanoff brothers published a number of works in science fiction, philosophy and popular science. Since 1991, they signed their books as "Bogdanov", preferring  "v" to "ff".
 Clefs pour la science-fiction (essay), Éditions Seghers, 378 p., Paris, 1976 , BNF:34707099q.
 L'Effet science-fiction: à la recherche d'une définition (essay), Éditions Robert Laffont, Paris, 1979, 423 p., BNF:34650185 g.
 Chroniques du "Temps X" (preface by Gérard Klein), Éditions du Guépard, Paris, 1981, 247 p., BNF: 34734883f.
 La Machine fantôme, Éditions J'ai lu, 1985, 251 p., BNF:34842073t.
 La Mémoire double (novel), first as hardcover on Éditions Hachette, Paris, 1985, 381 p., BNF:348362498; then as pocket book
 Dieu et la science: vers le métaréalisme (interviews with Jean Guitton): Hardcover Éditions Grasset, Paris, 1991, 195 p., BNF: 35458968t; then as a pocketbook
 Avant le Big Bang: la création du monde (essay), 2004
 Voyage vers l'Instant Zéro, Éditions EPA, Paris, 2006, 185 p., BNF: 40986028h.
 Nous ne sommes pas seuls dans l'univers, Éditions EPA, Paris, 2007, 191 p., BNF: 411885989.
 Au commencement du temps, Éditions Flammarion, Paris, 2009, 317 p., BNF: 420019981.
 Le Visage de Dieu, (with a preface by Robert Woodrow Wilson and endnotes by Jim Peebles, Robert Woodrow Wilson and John Mather, Éditions Grasset, Paris, May 2010, 282 p., BNF: 42207600f.
 Le Dernier Jour des dinosaures Éditions de la Martinière, Octobre 2011, 
 La Pensée de Dieu, (with endnotes by Luis Gonzalez-Mestres), Éditions Grasset, Paris, June 2012, 
 Le mystère du satellite Planck (Qu'y avait-il avant le Big Bang ?) (with preface and endnotes by Luis Gonzalez-Mestres, Éditions Eyrolles, June 2013, 
 La Fin du hasard, Éditions Grasset, Paris, Octobre 2013, 
 3 minutes pour comprendre la grande théorie du Big Bang (preface by John Mather, end notes by Luis Gonzalez-Mestres, Éditions Le Courrier du Livre, October 2014,

References

Sources
 Luboš Motl, L'équation Bogdanoff: le secret de l'origine de l'univers?, translated from English by Sonia Quémener, Marc Lenoir and Laurent Martein; Preface by Clóvis de Matos, Presses de la Renaissance, Paris, 2008, 237 pp., 

1949 births
Bogdanoff, Grichka
Bogdanoff, Igor
French television presenters
French science fiction writers
Controversies in France
Television controversies in France
French twins
French people of Russian descent
French people of Tatar descent
Sibling duos
French people of African-American descent
French people of Austrian descent
French people of Czech descent
Internet memes
People from Gers
Deaths from the COVID-19 pandemic in France